Union Iron Works, located in San Francisco, California, on the southeast waterfront, was a central business within the large industrial zone of Potrero Point, for four decades at the end of the nineteenth and beginning of the twentieth centuries.

History
Peter Donohue, an Irish immigrant, founded Union Brass & Iron Works in the south of Market area of San Francisco in 1849. It was later run by his son, James Donohue. After years as the premiere producer of mining, railroad, agricultural and locomotive machinery in California, Union Iron Works, led by I. M. Scott, entered the ship building business and relocated to Potrero Point where its shipyards still exist, making the site on the north side of the Potrero the longest running privately owned shipyard in the United States. After Bethlehem Shipbuilding Corporation bought the works in 1905, the consolidated company came to include the Alameda Works Shipyard, located across the San Francisco Bay in Alameda and the Hunter's Point shipyard to the south.

In 1885, the Union Iron Works launched the first steel-hulled ship on the west coast, built with steel from the Pacific Rolling Mills. In 1886, UIW was awarded a $1,000,000 contract to build the cruiser  for the United States Navy, which they completed in eighteen months.

An 1892 description of the yards stated that between 1200 and 1500 men were employed and the yearly gross revenue was between $2,000,000 and $4,000,000. By the turn of the century, the shipyard had expanded in area and employment had more than doubled to 3,500. These industrial facilities used five types of power, distributed throughout; electricity, compressed air, steam, hydraulic and coal or gas fire.
Union Iron works built a number of ships for the United States Navy. The latter two were subcontracted from the Holland Torpedo Boat Company, and were the first submarines built on the West Coast.

In 1902, the Union Iron Works was absorbed into a combine called the United States Shipbuilding Company and was mired in three years of litigation. In 1905, the entire  shipyard was purchased by Bethlehem Shipbuilding Corporation for one million dollars. Charles M. Schwab stood on the steps of the UIW office building on 20th Street during the auction. At this point, he was the only bidder. Schwab was widely believed to have engineered the demise of the U.S. Shipbuilding Corporation in order to gain control of the industry. Whether or not that was true, he certainly benefited from the collapse of the US Shipbuilding combine.

At the time of the 1906 San Francisco earthquake, the coastal passenger liner  of the San Francisco and Portland Steamship Company had been undergoing a refit at the yard's hydraulic drydock. The earthquake caused the iron-hulled Columbia to shift off her supports and roll onto the drydock on her starboard side. This damaged the drydock, a key feature of the yard, beyond economic repair. Columbia on the other hand, despite being partially flooded and damaged, was repaired and returned to service in January 1907. In 1908, Bethlehem Shipbuilding Corporation bought the Hunter's Point drydocks. In the pre-World War I era, Union Iron Works built several navy ships that became internationally famous due to the Spanish–American War including Commodore Dewey's flagship the Olympia. After 1905, the shipyard operated as part of Bethlehem Steel, and produced both warships and merchant ships. The shipyard was expanded in 1911 by purchasing Risdon Iron Works, the land next to the shipyard. Risdon Iron Works built locomotives, this was closed and a new shipyard was built to build US Navy including destroyers and submarines. Risdon Iron Works was founded by John Risdon of Saline, Michigan in 1896. Risdon Iron Works started by building boilers, iron pipes, steam engines and gas engines. From 1873 to 1909 Risdon Iron Works also built ships, tugs, ferries and barges. John Risdon held the patents for the first river mining dredge.

World War II Slipways

Locomotives built

The named locomotives built by Union Iron Works were:

 for the San Francisco and San Jose Railroad
 California, Atlantic, Union
 for the Central Pacific Railroad
 A. A. Sargent
 for the Pittsburg Railroad
 Mt. Diablo, Boston, Sampson
 for the Black Diamond Coal Mining Railroad (also known as the "Black Diamond Railroad")
 D. O. Mills
 for the California Pacific Railroad
 Calistoga
 for the Virginia and Truckee Railroad
 Lyon, Ormsby, Storey
 for the San Francisco and North Pacific Railroad
 W. C. Ralston, J. G. Downey, Geyser, Santa Rosa, Ukiah
 for the Battle Mountain and Lewis Railroad
 John D. Hall, Starr Grove
 S. H. Harmon for the Gualala Railroad
 F. Camacho for the Acajutla and Sonsonate Railroad

Ships built

Some of the ships and ferries built by Union Iron Works include:
  launched in 1893, still in service as of 2019
  launched in 1893
  launched in 1898
 Berkeley, Southern Pacific Railroad ferry 1898, constructed simultaneously with USS Wisconsin in an adjacent drydock. First complete ferry built by Union Iron Works
 San Pablo, Atchison, Topeka & Santa Fe Railroad passenger ferry. 1899. Sold for scrap in 1937. Hull became first fish reduction plant on San Pablo Bay
 Tamalpais, 1900 Northwest Railroad passenger ferry. Burned for scrap 1947
  launched in 1901
  launched in 1891
  launched in 1900
  launched in 1897
  launched in 1897
  launched in 1888
  launched 26 October 1889
  launched in 1892. Admiral Dewey's flagship at the Battle of Manila Bay
  a  launched in 1903
  a  launched in 1904
  launched in 1898
 San Pedro, 1910 Atchison Topeka & Santa Fe Railroad passenger ferry. Renamed Treasure Island when it joined Key System in 1938
 Napa Valley, 1910 Monticello Steamship Company passenger ferry. Sold and resold until scrapped at Portland, Oregon in 1956
 Tanker SS Acme for the United States Shipping Board in 1916
  steel tanker for Standard Oil of New Jersey, launched 8 August 1917
 3 tankers for Union Oil of California
 Olinda, La Brea, Los Angeles
 6 of 27 R-class submarines
 first keel laid: R-16, 26 April 1917, last: R-19, 23 June 1917
 first launch: R-15, 10 December 1917, last: R-19, 28 January 1918
  ... 
 12 of 51 S-class submarines
  ... 
 26 of 111 s for the United States Navy between 1917 and 1919
 first keel laid: Ringold, 20 October 1917, last: Stansbury, 9 December 1918
 first launch: McKee, 23 March 1918, last: Stansbury, 16 May 1919
 8 are launched on 4 July 1918
  ... 
  ... 
  ... 
 40 of 156 s for the United States Navy between 1918 and 1921
  ... 
 3 ferries for Six Minute Ferry Co. auto ferry. Short-lived ferry company funded by "Sunny Jim" James Rolph
 San Mateo, Shasta, Yosemite
 3 ferries for the Richmond–San Francisco Transportation Company in 1924
 El Paso, New Orleans, Klamath
 3 of 6  ferries for the Southern Pacific Railroad in 1927
 Fresno, Stockton, Mendocino
 2 of 4 s
 ,  for the United States Navy in 1937 and 1938
  5 of 95 C1-B
 contract date: 18 Sep 1939
 Cape San Martin, launched 6 Aug 1940, delivered 3 Feb 1941 to Grace Line
 Alcoa Pioneer, launched 4 Oct 1940, delivered to Alcoa Steamship Company
 Alcoa Pilgrim, laid down 8 Aug 1940, launched 10 Jan 1941
 Alcoa Patriot, laid down 9 Oct 1940, launched 12 March 1941
 Alcoa Puritan, laid down 15 Jan 1941, launched 3 July 1941
 detailed description of the design of these vessels in 
 two 450 psi 740 °F water tube boilers
 4,000shp Bethlehem Quincy cross compound steam turbine, double reduction gears, one shaft
 following the Two-Ocean Navy Act
 4 of 8 s; for the United States Navy between 1941 and 1945
 36 of 415 destroyers
 9 of 30 s for the United States Navy in 1941 and 1942
 , 
  ... 
 18 of 175 s for the United States Navy in 1942 and 1943
  ... 
 , 
 6 of 58 s for the United States Navy in 1944 and 1945
  ... 
 3 of 98 s
  ... 
 in addition: ,  cancelled, launched incomplete
 12 of 563 destroyer escorts and APDs
 12 of 148 s for the United States Navy in 1943 and 1944
  ... 

Ships reconstructed by the Union Iron Works include:
  - Refitted unsuccessfully due to heavy damage caused by the 1906 San Francisco earthquake. Refit and repairs completed elsewhere.

See also

Alameda Works Shipyard
California during World War II#Ship building
Potrero Point
Pier 70, San Francisco
San Francisco Maritime National Historical Park

References

Bethlehem Steel Company Shipbuilding Division. A century of progress, 1849-1949: San Francisco Yard. San Francisco, 1949

Mains'l Haul - Journal of Pacific Maritime History - Fall 1998

External links

 Images of America: Black Diamond Mines Regional Preserve (Google Books "preview" version; contains some locomotive photographs)
Museum of San Francisco
Current photos and history
A guide to the Irving Murray Scott Jr. business papers and plans, 1881-1943
Finding Aid to the Bethlehem Steel Corporation. Shipbuilding Division Photographs, circa 1900-1945
A guide to the John T. Scott photograph collection, 1856-1923
A guide to the John T. Scott photograph collection, 1900-1916
A guide to the John Thomas Scott business papers and plans, 1888-1921

Defunct shipbuilding companies of the United States
Shipbuilding companies of California
Manufacturing companies based in San Francisco
Bethlehem Steel
Bethlehem shipyards
Defunct manufacturing companies based in the San Francisco Bay Area
Marine engine manufacturers
Potrero Hill, San Francisco
Manufacturing companies established in 1849
1849 establishments in California
History of San Francisco
Engine manufacturers of the United States
Defunct locomotive manufacturers of the United States
Defunct manufacturing companies based in California
Shipyards building World War II warships